Mary Lea Trump (born May 3, 1965) is an American psychologist and author. A niece of former president Donald Trump, she has been critical of him as well as the rest of the Trump family. Her 2020 book about him and the family, Too Much and Never Enough, sold nearly one million copies on the day of its release. A second book, The Reckoning, followed in 2021.

In late 2020, Trump sued her uncle Donald, aunt Maryanne, and the estate of her late uncle Robert, claiming that they defrauded her of tens of millions of dollars from her interests in her grandfather Fred Trump's real-estate portfolio. A year later, Donald Trump sued Mary for at least $100 million for providing The New York Times with financial documents which it used as a source for a 2018 exposé about his wealth and the family's finances.

Early life and education
Trump was born in May 1965 to flight attendant Linda Lee Clapp and Fred Trump Jr., a commercial airline pilot of Trans World Airlines and son of real-estate developer Fred Trump (Donald Trump's father). Her older brother is Frederick Trump III.

Mary Trump's father, Fred Trump Jr., died on September 29, 1981, at the age of 42 from a heart attack caused by alcoholism, when she was aged 16. She was at school, watching a film in the auditorium with other children when a teacher pulled her aside and made her call home. She found out after a series of phone calls that her father had died. Mary was not able to see her father's body despite her request to do so and had to be content with saying her goodbye to a closed coffin at the funeral.

Mary Lea Trump graduated from the Ethel Walker School in 1983. She studied English literature at Tufts University, earned a master's degree in English literature at Columbia University, for which she studied the works of William Faulkner and his dysfunctional fictional Compson family, and holds a PhD in clinical psychology from the Derner Institute of Advanced Psychological Studies at Adelphi University.

Will of Fred Trump Sr.

Fred Trump Sr.'s will left the bulk of his estate, in equal shares, to his surviving children, while each of his grandchildren was left $200,000. In 1981, when Mary's father predeceased him, Fred Sr.'s lawyers had recommended amending his will, to leave Fred Trump Jr.'s children larger shares than the grandchildren with living parents, writing that "Given the size of your estate, this is tantamount to disinheriting them. You may wish to increase their participation in your estate to avoid ill will in the future." However, Fred Trump Sr. refused to do so.

Fred Sr. was diagnosed with "mild senile dementia" in 1991 and about two years later began to suffer from Alzheimer's disease. Donald Trump, at the time facing financial ruin, sought control of his elderly father's estate, leading to an epic family fight. When Fred Trump Sr. died in 1999, Mary Trump and her brother, Fred Trump III, contested their grandfather's will.

Shortly after Fred Sr.'s death, Fred III's wife gave birth to a son named William, who has infantile spasms, a rare and debilitating medical condition requiring a lifetime of care. Fred Sr. had established a foundation that paid the medical expenses of his family. Mary Trump and her brother filed suit against Donald Trump and two of his three living siblings, Maryanne Trump Barry and Robert Trump, for exerting undue influence on the elderly Fred Sr.'s will. In response, Donald, Maryanne and Robert cut off Mary and Fred III's medical insurance, including coverage for William. The lawsuit was settled in 2001, with Mary and Fred III selling their interests in the family business (which included ground leases for two of Fred Sr.'s major properties).

In 2018, Mary Trump provided financial records, including some Trump family tax returns, to The New York Times for its exposé on Fred and Donald Trump's finances, which alleges that the latter "participated in dubious tax schemes ... including instances of outright fraud".

In September 2020, Trump sued her uncle Donald, aunt Maryanne, and the estate of her late uncle Robert, claiming that they defrauded her of tens of millions of dollars from her interests in Fred Sr.'s real-estate portfolio by undervaluing her interests and coercing her to sign a settlement. The defendants' lawyers asked for dismissal of the lawsuit, claiming that she had waited too long to file suit. Trump's lawyers responded that "[r]easonable diligence would not have uncovered the fraud" more than a decade earlier. In a January 2022 hearing, lawyers for Donald Trump, Maryanne Trump Barry, and the estate of Robert Trump asked for Mary Trump's lawsuit to be dismissed, arguing that she had waited too long to file her lawsuit because she had had access to the relevant documents since 2001 and that a  statute of limitations imposed by the 2001 settlement had expired. In November 2022, the lawsuit was dismissed on the basis that Trump's 2001 settlement agreement had "unambiguously released defendants from unknown claims, including fraud claims".

In September 2021, Donald Trump filed a lawsuit against his niece and The New York Times (namely the authors of the 2018 exposé) for upwards of $100 million. The suit accuses Mary Trump and the three New York Times journalists of being "engaged in an insidious plot" to gain confidential documents in a "personal vendetta" against Donald Trump. Mary Trump called the lawsuit an act of "desperation", stating about her uncle, "I think he is a fucking loser, and he is going to throw anything against the wall he can." A remote hearing about the matter was scheduled for June 21, 2022. Another hearing was held on January 19, 2023, when a lawyer for the Times argued that the most important fact of the matter was the truthfulness of the exposé's accusations. Trump lawyer Alina Habba highlighted Mary Trump's use of a burner phone to communicate with the journalists, which the Times' defense said was to protect their source and of no legal significance.

Career 
Trump worked for one year at the Manhattan Psychiatric Center while working on her PhD research. She is a contributor to the book Diagnosis: Schizophrenia, published by Columbia University Press in 2001. She has taught graduate courses in developmental psychology, trauma, and psychopathology. She is the founder and chief executive officer of The Trump Coaching Group, a life-coaching company, and has also owned and operated a number of small businesses in the Northeast.

Too Much and Never Enough 

Trump's first book, Too Much and Never Enough: How My Family Created the World's Most Dangerous Man, is an unauthorized biography of Donald Trump published on July 14, 2020, by Simon & Schuster. According to Trump's note at the beginning of the book, all accounts in the book come either from her own memory or from recorded conversations with family, friends, and others. Other sources are legal, financial and family documents, email correspondence, and the New York Times investigative article by David Barstow, Susanne Craig, and Russ Buettner. The book details how Mary Trump was the anonymous source who provided The New York Times with Trump family tax returns. The New York Times report won the 2019 Pulitzer Prize.

Upon the announcement of Trump's book Too Much and Never Enough in June 2020, her uncle Robert Trump attempted to block its release, stating that she signed a non-disclosure agreement as part of the 2001 lawsuit settlement. The filing of a temporary restraining order against Mary Trump was dismissed by a New York court for a lack of jurisdiction, and the book was published on July 14, 2020.

The book sold close to one million copies on its first day of sales.

The Reckoning 

Trump's second book, The Reckoning: Our Nation's Trauma and Finding a Way to Heal, was published by St. Martin's Press on August 17, 2021. Drawing from American history, Trump posits that the country has suffered trauma from its inception because of its inclusion of systemic racism and its failure to address the existence of white supremacy, especially by Republicans in recent decades.

The Mary Trump Show 
Trump has a podcast, titled The Mary Trump Show, on which she discusses politics and other matters. On February 1, 2022, she announced that she would be removing her show from Spotify to protest alleged COVID-19 misinformation being spread on The Joe Rogan Experience, which is exclusively distributed on Spotify.

Politics
Trump supported Hillary Clinton during the 2016 presidential election.

In 2018, David Barstow, Susanne Craig and Russ Buettner of The New York Times published "an exhaustive 18-month investigation of Donald Trump's finances that debunked his statements of self-made wealth and revealed a business empire riddled with tax dodges", for which they were awarded the 2019 Pulitzer Prize in Explanatory Reporting. Mary Trump has stated that she was a key source of information for that study, having come into possession of Donald Trump's tax documents during the discovery process in the dispute over her grandfather's estate.

On July 15, 2020, Trump said in an ABC News interview conducted by George Stephanopoulos that Donald Trump should resign as president, as he was "utterly incapable of leading this country, and it's dangerous to allow him to do so". In an interview later that month on The Late Show with Stephen Colbert, Trump stated that Donald Trump exhibited sociopathic tendencies but not at a high-functioning level like his father. She said the president was institutionally insulated from responsibilities throughout his childhood and was never held accountable for his actions.

After the 2021 U.S. Capitol attack, Trump said her uncle should be "barred from ever running for public office again".

Personal life
Trump is openly gay. In Too Much and Never Enough, she makes a brief reference to the fact and states that "Nobody in the family knew; they'd always been spectacularly uninterested in my personal life ... and never asked about my boyfriends or relationships." She wrote that her grandmother, Mary Anne MacLeod Trump, once  referred to Elton John as a "faggot", and consequently, Trump decided not to come out and tell her grandmother or other immediate family that she was going to marry a woman, with whom she would later raise a daughter. She has since divorced, and lives on Long Island, New York, with her 21-year-old daughter, who was conceived by in-vitro fertilization with a sperm donor.

References

External links

 
 The Psychology of Donald Trump

1965 births
21st-century American businesspeople
21st-century American businesswomen
21st-century American women scientists
21st-century American women writers
Adelphi University alumni
American clinical psychologists
American LGBT businesspeople
American LGBT scientists
American LGBT writers 
American women psychologists
21st-century American psychologists
Businesspeople from New York City
Columbia Graduate School of Arts and Sciences alumni
LGBT people from New York (state)
LGBT women
Living people
New York (state) Democrats
Scientists from New York City
Mary L.
Tufts University School of Arts and Sciences alumni
Writers from New York City
LGBT psychologists